Scirpoides is a genus of sedges (Cyperaceae), native to Europe and adjoining areas, and introduced elsewhere. It was split off from Scirpus.

Species
Species include:

Scirpoides burkei (C.B.Clarke) Goetgh., Muasya & D.A.Simpson
Scirpoides holoschoenus (L.) Soják
Scirpoides mexicana (C.B.Clarke ex Britton) Goetgh. ex C.S.Reid & J.R.Carter
Scirpoides varia Browning

References

Cyperaceae genera
Cyperaceae